Dichloralphenazone is a 1:2 mixture of antipyrine with chloral hydrate.  In combination with paracetamol and isometheptene, it is the active ingredient of medications for migraine and tension headaches, including Epidrin and Midrin. Performance impairments are common with this drug and caution is advised, for example when driving motor vehicles. Additional uses of dichloralphenazone include sedation for the treatment of short-term insomnia, although there are probably better drug choices for the treatment of insomnia.

See also 
 Chloral betaine

References

External links 
 

Analgesics
Hypnotics
Sedatives
Combination drugs
GABAA receptor positive allosteric modulators